Dallas Ehrhardt (born 31 July 1992) is an ice hockey defenceman playing for Manchester Storm of the Elite Ice Hockey League.

His brother Travis Ehrhardt also plays ice hockey.

References

External links

1992 births
Living people
British ice hockey defencemen
Canadian ice hockey defencemen
Brandon Wheat Kings players
Moose Jaw Warriors players
Prince George Cougars players
Evansville IceMen players
Allen Americans players
Missouri Mavericks players
Rapid City Rush players
Wheeling Nailers players
Manchester Storm (2015–) players
Canadian expatriate ice hockey players in the United States
Canadian expatriate ice hockey players in France
Ice hockey people from Calgary
Canadian expatriate ice hockey players in England
Canadian people of English descent
Citizens of the United Kingdom through descent
Alumni of the University of Salford